"Far Behind" is a song by the American rock band Candlebox and the third single from their eponymous debut album. It is one of the band's most well-known songs, entering the charts in July 1993 and remaining there until January the following year when it was officially released as a single. It is the group's highest-charting hit, peaking at #18 on the Billboard Hot 100, after spending almost a year on the chart. It also reached #4 and #7, on the Billboard Album Rock Tracks and Modern Rock Tracks charts, respectively. "Far Behind" was also included on The Best of Candlebox in 2006.

Meaning
"Far Behind" is one of a few hit 1990s singles written in tribute to the late singer Andrew Wood. In a 1994 interview with Playgirl, Candlebox frontman Kevin Martin stated that it was inspired by two friends who overdosed on heroin and "represents the loss of love between friends and having to be left with the feeling of emptiness." He elaborated in a 2008 interview:
"I wrote 'Far Behind' for Andy Wood. I was a huge Malfunkshun fan and a huge Mother Love Bone fan and I got to know Andy early on in his career when I was working in a shoe store with Susan Silver who was managing Mother Love Bone, Soundgarden, and Alice in Chains."

Appearances
The song was performed on Late Show with David Letterman amidst the promotion of Candlebox. During the 2000s, it has appeared on various 1990s compilation albums such as; MTV the First 1000 Years: Rock, Double Shot: Alt Rock, Essential Music Videos: '90s Rock, The Buzz, Buzz Ballads, and Whatever: The '90s Pop and Culture Box. The song can be heard on an episode of the HBO series Eastbound & Down when Kenny Powers goes to his friend's funeral while carrying a boombox on his shoulder. In the SyFy Channel's television show Alphas the song was played in season 2, episode 4. In Chile, the song was soundtrack soap opera of Canal 13 Las Vega's.

Music video
The "Far Behind" video was directed by Nick Egan. It was filmed at the now razed Elliott Farm in Renton, Washington and revolves mainly around the old farmhouse's now supposed inhabitants. Early on, Martin sings with a corded microphone while walking through the neglected structure. A cheerful young woman is also seen sitting at the edge of a grimy, near-empty outdoor pool. The chorus then has a man splashing red paint across the white walls. Various people are seen lying around the house including a lone, weary looking man in a bathtub who at one point appears to be defending himself from a drowning attempt. Song lyrics are scribbled along parts of the walls, and an American flag serves as a backdrop to certain shots. "Far Behind" aired heavily on MTV and was one of the most requested videos of 1994.

I Didn't Mean To Treat You Bad

In April 2015, Kxng Crooked (aka Crooked I) of the Shady Records hip-hop group Slaughterhouse released an interpolation of "Far Behind" called "I Didn't Mean To Treat You Bad" that features singer Shalé. The song was produced by Jonathan Hay and Mike Smith for the album When Music Worlds Collide.

Track list
 Far Behind (album version) (4:58)
 Far Behind/Voodoo Child (Slight Return) (live) (9:01) 
 You (live) (5:27)

Charts

References

External links
 "Far Behind" Music Video on MTV.com

1993 songs
1994 singles
Candlebox songs
Maverick Records singles
Sire Records singles
Songs about drugs
Commemoration songs